Robert Melton Fox (September 9, 1934 – 1986) was an American football player and coach. A quarterback at Texas A&M University–Commerce, he was drafted by the Baltimore Colts in the 1956 NFL Draft. Fox served as the head football coach at Tarleton State University from 1983 to 1984, compiling a record of 8–12.

Head coaching record

References

1934 births
Place of birth missing
1986 deaths
Date of death missing
American football quarterbacks
Texas A&M–Commerce Lions football players
Tarleton State Texans football coaches
Texas A&M–Commerce Lions football coaches